Ryoko Yano (矢野良子, born 20 December 1978) is a Japanese basketball player who competed in the 2004 Summer Olympics.

Awards
Women's Japan Basketball League
Play off MVP（2003-04,2007-08）
Season MVP（2006-07,2009-10）

References

1978 births
Living people
Japanese women's basketball players
Olympic basketball players of Japan
Basketball players at the 2004 Summer Olympics
Basketball players at the 2002 Asian Games
Asian Games competitors for Japan